Theater Breaking Through Barriers (TBTB), formerly Theater By the Blind, is an inclusive theater company in New York City that strives develop the talents of individuals with disabilities for work onstage, backstage, in the office and in the audience.  It was founded in 1979 by Ike Schambelan(who died of cancer in 2015), with sighted actors recording plays for the blind.  The theater then moved to performances for the blind and then blind performances for the sighted. They recently began doing a short play festival each year.

Crystal Clear
Crystal Clear by Phil Young opened in 1986 at the Long Wharf Theater's Stage II.  The show starred (George Ashiotis) who played a young actor who is gradually going blind from diabetes and his girlfriend who has been blind from birth (Lucia Puccia) .  Crystal Clear began as an improvisation on a London pub stage in 1982.

The production had mixed reviews from critics. Mel Gusso said for The New York Times, "It is diagnostic rather than psychologically probing."  Another critic said the play was "a wildly unfocused work that tries to cover too vast a terrain" and that it contained "a cornucopia of cliches".

A Midsummer Night's Dream
A Midsummer Night's Dream by William Shakespeare staged at the Barrow Group Theater in Manhattan, was the first play by TBTB to feature a character in a wheelchair:

A note in the theater program said, "Increasingly we feel we must include all disabled people [rather than blind people only] in our work." To reflect this shift in thought and philosophy, 2008 saw the company changing its name from Theater By The Blind to Theater Breaking Through Barriers. Productions, such as Romeo & Juliet, closely followed featuring an actor, Gregg Mozgala,  with Cerebral Palsy, their first in a subsequent line of productions incorporating actors with various disabilities. In 2020 as a result of the pandemic they presented playwriting intensives and performances via Zoom with captions and audio descriptions.

Notes

External links
 

Theatrical organizations in the United States
Blindness organizations in the United States
Disability theatre
1979 establishments in New York City
Culture of New York City
Theatre companies in New York City